The 2020 Newfoundland and Labrador Women's Curling Championship, the women's provincial curling championship for Newfoundland and Labrador, was held from January 11 to 15 at the Re/Max Centre in St. John's, Newfoundland and Labrador. The winning Erica Curtis rink represented Newfoundland and Labrador at the 2020 Scotties Tournament of Hearts in Moose Jaw, Saskatchewan and finished with a 1–6 record.

Teams
The teams are listed as follows:

Round-robin standings
Final round-robin standings

Round-robin results
All draws are listed in Newfoundland Time (UTC−03:30).

Draw 1
Saturday, January 11, 1:30 pm

Draw 2
Sunday, January 12, 8:30 am

Draw 3
Sunday, January 12, 1:30 pm

Draw 4
Monday, January 13, 1:30 pm

Draw 5
Monday, January 13, 7:00 pm

Tiebreakers
Tuesday, January 14, 8:30 am

Tuesday, January 14, 2:00 pm

Final
Tuesday, January 14, 7:30 pm

References

External links

Newfoundland and Labrador
Sport in St. John's, Newfoundland and Labrador
Curling in Newfoundland and Labrador
January 2020 sports events in Canada
2020 in Newfoundland and Labrador